Biarmosuchia is an extinct clade of non-mammalian synapsids from the Permian. Biarmosuchians are the most basal group of the therapsids. They were moderately-sized, lightly-built carnivores, intermediate in form between basal sphenacodont "pelycosaurs" and more advanced therapsids. Biarmosuchians were rare components of Permian ecosystems, and the majority of species belong to the clade Burnetiamorpha, which are characterized by elaborate cranial ornamentation.

Characteristics

The biarmosuchian skull is very similar to the sphenacodontid skull, differing only in the larger temporal fenestra (although these are still small relative to later therapsids), slightly backward-sloping occiput (the reverse of the pelycosaur condition), reduced number of teeth, and single large canine teeth in both upper and lower jaws, and other features (Carroll 1988 pp. 370, Benton 2000 p. 114). In later specialised Biarmosuchia, these resemble the enlarged canines of the Gorgonopsia. The presence of larger jaw-closing muscles (and hence a stronger bite) is indicated by the flaring of the rear of the skull where these muscles were attached. Burnetiamorphs, which made up the majority of biarmosuchian diversity, were characterized by elaborate cranial ornamentation consisting of bumps and bosses. Some burnetiids have a thick domed skull reminiscent of dinocephalians and pachycephalosaur dinosaurs.

The vertebrae are also sphenacodontid-like (but lack the long neural spines that distinguish Dimetrodon and its kin), but the shoulder and pelvic girdles and the limbs indicate a much more advanced posture. The feet are more symmetrical, indicating that they faced forward throughout the stride, and the phalanges (fingers/toes) are reduced in length so that they are more like that of later synapsids (therapsids and mammals) (Carroll 1988 pp. 370–1).

Biarmosuchians ranged in size from relatively small species with skulls 10–15 cm in length to large species such as Biarmosuchus, which may have had a skull  in length.

Distribution
Currently the most representative group of the Biarmosuchia, the Burnetiamorpha, comprise ten genera: Bullacephalus, Burnetia, Lemurosaurus, Lobalopex, Lophorhinus, Paraburnetia, and Pachydectes from South Africa, Niuksenitia and Proburnetia from Russia, and Lende (MAL 290) from Malawi. In addition, Sidor et al. (2010) recently described a partial skull roof including the dorsal margin of orbits and parietal foramen of an unnamed burnetiid from the upper Permian of Tanzania, and Sidor et al. (2014)  noted the presence of a burnetiid in the middle Permian of Zambia. Other Biarmosuchia include Biarmosuchus from Russia, Hipposaurus, Herpetoskylax, Ictidorhinus and Lycaenodon from South Africa, and Wantulignathus from Zambia.

Classification

Biarmosuchians are typically considered the most basal major lineage of therapsids. Biarmosuchia consists of a paraphyletic series of basal biarmosuchians that are fairly typical early therapsids, and the derived clade Burnetiamorpha, characterized by skulls ornamented by horns and bosses.

Taxonomic history
Biarmosuchians were the last of the six major therapsid lineages to be recognized. The majority of biarmosuchians were once considered gorgonopsians. James Hopson and Herbert Richard Barghusen (1986 p. 88) tentatively united Biarmosuchidae and Ictidorhinidae (including Hipposauridae and Rubidginidae) as "Biarmosuchia", but were undecided as to whether they constituted a natural group or an assemblage that had in common only shared primitive characteristics. They thought that Phthinosuchus was too poorly known to tell if it also belonged, but considered Eotitanosuchus a more advanced form.

Denise Sigogneau-Russell (1989) erected the infraorder Biarmosuchia to include the families Biarmosuchidae, Hipposauridae and Ictidorhinidae, distinct from Eotitanosuchia and Phthinosuchia.

Ivakhnenko (1999) argued that Biarmosuchus tener, Eotitanosuchus olsoni, and Ivantosaurus ensifer, all known from the Ezhovo locality, Ocher Faunal Assemblage, are actually the same species. Even if these taxa are shown to be distinct, Ivakhnenko's paper indicates that Eotitanosuchus and Biarmosuchus are very similar animals. Ivakhnenko also relocates the family Eotitanosuchidae to the order Titanosuchia, superorder Dinocephalia.

Benton 2000 and 2004 gives the Biarmosuchia the rank of suborder.

Paleoecology

Biarmosuchians were rare components of their ecosystems; only one specimen is known for most species. However, they were moderately diverse and there were multiple contemporary species in some ecosystems. All were predators similar to gorgonopsians and therocephalians, though they were generally not apex predators.

See also
 Evolution of mammals
 Permian tetrapods
 Tetraceratops

References

Further reading
 Benton, M. J. (2000), Vertebrate Paleontology, 2nd Ed. Blackwell Science Ltd. (2004) 3rd edition
 Carroll, R. L. (1988), Vertebrate Paleontology and Evolution, WH Freeman & Co.
 Hopson, J.A. and Barghusen, H.R. (1986), An analysis of therapsid relationships in N Hotton, III, PD MacLean, JJ Roth and EC Roth, The Ecology and Biology of Mammal-like Reptiles, Smithsonian Institution Press, pp. 83–106
 Ivakhnenko, M.F. 1999, Biarmosuches from the Ocher Faunal Assemblage of Eastern Europe, Paleontological Journal vol 33 no.3 pp. 289–296. abstract
 Sigogneau-Russell, D., 1989, "Theriodontia I - Phthinosuchia, Biarmosuchia, Eotitanosuchia, Gorgonopsia" Part 17 B I, Encyclopedia of Paleoherpetology, Gutsav Fischer Verlag, Stuttgart and New York,

External links
Therapsida: Biarmosuchia at Palaeos

 
Fossil taxa described in 1989
Guadalupian first appearances
Lopingian extinctions
Animal suborders
Taxa named by Denise Sigogneau‐Russell